The AFC first round of 2022 FIFA World Cup qualification, which also served as the first round of 2023 AFC Asian Cup qualification, was played from 6 to 11 June 2019.

Format
A total of twelve teams (teams ranked 35–46 in the AFC entrant list) played home-and-away over two legs. The six winners advanced to the second round.

The six losers were eligible to enter the 2020 AFC Solidarity Cup, which was subsequently cancelled.

Timor-Leste were barred from participating in the qualification tournament after being found to have fielded a total of twelve ineligible players in 2019 AFC Asian Cup qualification matches, among other competitions. However, as FIFA did not bar Timor-Leste from the 2022 FIFA World Cup qualifiers, they were still allowed to enter the competition, but were ineligible to qualify for the Asian Cup.

Seeding
The draw for the first round was held on 17 April 2019 at 11:00 MST (UTC+8), at the AFC House in Kuala Lumpur, Malaysia.

The seeding was based on the FIFA World Rankings of April 2019 (shown in parentheses below). Teams from Pot A hosted the first leg, while teams from Pot B hosted the second leg.

Note: Bolded teams qualified for the second round.

Summary
The first legs were played on 6–7 June, and the second legs on 11 June 2019.

Matches

Mongolia won 3–2 on aggregate and advanced to the second round.

Sri Lanka won 3–1 on aggregate and advanced to the second round.

Bangladesh won 1–0 on aggregate and advanced to the second round.

Malaysia won 12–2 on aggregate and advanced to the second round.

Cambodia won 4–1 on aggregate and advanced to the second round.

Guam won 5–1 on aggregate and advanced to the second round.

Goalscorers

Notes

References

External links

Qualifiers – Asia Matches: Round 1, FIFA.com
FIFA World Cup, the-AFC.com
AFC Asian Cup, the-AFC.com
Preliminary Joint Qualification 2022, stats.the-AFC.com

1
1
2019 in Asian football
FIFA World Cup qualification, AFC Round 1